Vito Di Terlizzi (7 August 1930 – 15 April 2021) was an Italian long-distance runner. He competed in the marathon at the 1960 Summer Olympics.

References

External links
 

1930 births
2021 deaths
Athletes (track and field) at the 1960 Summer Olympics
Italian male long-distance runners
Italian male marathon runners
Olympic athletes of Italy
Sportspeople from Bari